

This is a list of the National Register of Historic Places listings in Ward County, North Dakota.

This is intended to be a complete list of the properties and districts on the National Register of Historic Places in Ward County, North Dakota, United States. The locations of National Register properties and districts for which the latitude and longitude coordinates are included below, may be seen in a map.

There are 15 properties and districts listed on the National Register in the county.

Current listings

|}

See also 

 National Register of Historic Places listings in North Dakota

References 

Ward
Ward County, North Dakota